FC Yalos Yalta was a Ukrainian football club based in Yalta, Crimea. The club was founded in 2005. They competed in the Druha Liha for a season.  After the 2005–06 season the club didn't submit a license and elected to remove themselves from the PFL.

League and cup history (Ukraine)

{|class="wikitable"
|-bgcolor="#efefef"
! Season
! Div.
! Pos.
! Pl.
! W
! D
! L
! GS
! GA
! P
!Domestic Cup
!colspan=2|Europe
!Notes
|- bgcolor=PowderBlue
|align=center|2005–06
|align=center|3rd "B"
|align=center|4
|align=center|28
|align=center|12
|align=center|7
|align=center|9
|align=center|28
|align=center|27
|align=center|43
|align=center|1/16 finals
|align=center|
|align=center|
|align=center bgcolor=lightgrey|Withdrew
|}

See also
 FC Komunalnyk Luhansk, a short term team
 FC Feniks-Illichovets Kalinine

References

 
Yalos Yalta
Association football clubs established in 2005
Association football clubs disestablished in 2006
2005 establishments in Ukraine
2006 disestablishments in Ukraine